

295001–295100 

|-bgcolor=#f2f2f2
| colspan=4 align=center | 
|}

295101–295200 

|-bgcolor=#f2f2f2
| colspan=4 align=center | 
|}

295201–295300 

|-id=299
| 295299 Nannidiana ||  || Giovanni Foglia (born 1932) and Diana Damiani (born 1938), the parents of Italian amateur astronomer Sergio Foglia, who is a discoverer of minor planets || 
|}

295301–295400 

|-bgcolor=#f2f2f2
| colspan=4 align=center | 
|}

295401–295500 

|-id=471
| 295471 Herbertnitsch ||  || Herbert Nitsch (born 1970) is an Austrian freediver who holds a men's world records in no-limits apnea at 214 m. || 
|-id=472
| 295472 Puy ||  || Denis Puy (born 1962), a Professor at the University of Montpellier and head of the Laboratory Universe and Particles of Montpellier. || 
|-id=473
| 295473 Cochard ||  || François Cochard (born 1965), a French engineer, who has promoted spectroscopy by amateur astronomers. || 
|}

295501–295600 

|-id=565
| 295565 Hannover ||  || Hannover, the capital city of Niedersachsen, Germany || 
|}

295601–295700 

|-bgcolor=#f2f2f2
| colspan=4 align=center | 
|}

295701–295800 

|-bgcolor=#f2f2f2
| colspan=4 align=center | 
|}

295801–295900 

|-id=841
| 295841 Gorbulin ||  || Volodymyr Pavlovych Gorbulin (born 1939) is a member of National Academy of Sciences of Ukraine and the International Academy of Astronautics. He was the first General Director of the National Space Agency of Ukraine (1992–1994). || 
|}

295901–296000 

|-bgcolor=#f2f2f2
| colspan=4 align=center | 
|}

References 

295001-296000